The 1989–90 NCAA Division I men's ice hockey season began in October 1989 and concluded with the 1990 NCAA Division I Men's Ice Hockey Tournament's championship game on April 1, 1990, at the Joe Louis Arena in Detroit, Michigan. This was the 43rd season in which an NCAA ice hockey championship was held and is the 96th year overall where an NCAA school fielded a team.

Regular season

Season tournaments

Standings

1990 NCAA Tournament

Player stats

Scoring leaders
The following players led the league in points at the conclusion of the season.

  
GP = Games played; G = Goals; A = Assists; Pts = Points; PIM = Penalty minutes

Leading goaltenders
The following goaltenders led the league in goals against average at the end of the regular season while playing at least 33% of their team's total minutes.

GP = Games played; Min = Minutes played; W = Wins; L = Losses; OT = Overtime/shootout losses; GA = Goals against; SO = Shutouts; SV% = Save percentage; GAA = Goals against average

Awards

NCAA

CCHA

ECAC

Hockey East

WCHA

See also
 1989–90 NCAA Division III men's ice hockey season

References

External links
College Hockey Historical Archives
1989–90 NCAA Standings

 
NCAA